"O, Capiz", also known as the Capiz Hymn, is the official provincial anthem of the province of Capiz in the Philippines.

History
"O, Capiz" was written by Charmaine O. Guartero, a high school music teacher at Filamer Christian University, besting 24 other songs entered in a province-sponsored competition for the selection of a provincial hymn. It was first performed on April 21, 2006 at the Hall of Governors in Roxas City, where Guartero was also awarded ₱20,000, a plaque and a certificate by Governor Vicente Bermejo.

The hymn was adopted on June 23, 2006 by an ordinance of the Sangguniang Panlalawigan of Capiz and performed for the first time at the charter anniversary of the province.  The current arrangement, meanwhile, was unveiled on June 25, 2007.  Bermejo later noted that in the Capizeños' quest for development, "we need a melody that will inspire us and forge our efforts together to achieve our dream for a better Capiz", describing "O, Capiz" as a unique expression of what the true Capiz is and what Capizeños really are.

The official video of "O, Capiz" is available on YouTube and cassette and CD copies of the hymn are being distributed to schools throughout the province.

Lyrics

References

External links

Regional songs
 Philippine anthems
Culture of Capiz
Asian anthems